Monterey Square is one of the 22 squares of Savannah, Georgia, United States. It is located in the southernmost row of the city's five rows of squares, on Bull Street and Wayne Street, and was laid out in 1847. It is south of Madison Square, west of Calhoun Square, north of Forsyth Park and east of Chatham Square. The oldest building on the square is the Herman Kuhlman Duplex, at 22–24 West Taylor Street, which dates to 1851.

Monterey Square commemorates the Battle of Monterrey (1846), in which American forces under General Zachary Taylor captured the city of Monterrey during the Mexican–American War. (The correct spelling in reference to the square is "Monterey", with a single r.)

In the center of the square is an 1853 monument honoring General Casimir Pulaski. 

Monterey Square is the site of Mercer House, built by Hugh Mercer and more recently the home of antiques dealer and conservator Jim Williams. The house (which fills an entire block), and the square itself, were featured prominently in John Berendt's 1994 true crime novel Midnight in the Garden of Good and Evil. The square has been used as a setting for several motion pictures, including the 1997 film version of Berendt's novel. The Comer House, in the northeastern residential/tything block, is also featured in the movie.

The square is home to Congregation Mickve Israel, which boasts one of the few Gothic-style synagogues in America, dating from 1878.

All but one of the buildings surrounding the square are original to the square, the exception being the United Way Building at 428 Bull Street.

Dedication

Markers and structures

Scudder's Row 

Scudder's Row is a historic row house comprising the five homes from 1 to 9 East Gordon Street in the southeastern residential block of the square. They were built between 1852 and 1853 by brothers John and Ephraim Scudder. John also built several of the homes on Savannah's Jones Street, which has been described as one of the most charming streets in America.

Other similar-style row houses exist in Savannah's Gordon Row, McDonough Row and Marshall Row.

Constituent buildings

Each building below is in one of the eight blocks around the square composed of four residential "tything" blocks and four civic ("trust") blocks, now known as the Oglethorpe Plan. They are listed with construction years where known.

Northwestern residential/tything block
Herman Kuhlman Duplex, 22–24 West Taylor Street (1851)
George Gray House, 20 West Taylor Street (1855) – altered in 1893
Andrew Farie House, 18 West Taylor Street (1913)
12 West Taylor Street (1868)
10 West Taylor Street (1872) – became the Hurn Museum in 2004
Nicholas Cruger House, 4 West Taylor Street (1852) – oldest building on the square

Northwestern civic/trust block
Revd. Charles W. Rogers House, 423–425 Bull Street (1858) – later the home of Lee and Emma Adler
John Lynch Building, 422 Whitaker Street (1880)

Southwestern civic/trust block
Mercer House, 429 Bull Street (1868)

Southwestern residential/tything block
Noble Hardee Mansion, 3 West Gordon Street (1860/1884)
7–9 West Gordon Street (1884)
11 West Gordon Street (1858)
John Williams Duplex, 17–19 West Gordon Street (1879–1882)
Joachim Saussy House, 23 West Gordon Street (1870)

Northeastern residential/tything block
Comer House, 2 East Taylor Street (1880)
William Hunter House, 10 East Taylor Street (1872)
Thomas-Levy House (western half of the Thomas-Purse Duplex), 12 East Taylor Street (1869/1894)
14 East Taylor Street (eastern half of the Thomas-Purse Duplex; 1869)
David Lopez Cohen Property (1), 16–20 East Taylor Street (1852)
David Lopez Cohen Property (2), 24 East Taylor Street (1852)
David Lopez Cohen Property (3), 28–32 East Taylor Street (1852)

Southeastern civic/trust block
Congregation Mickve Israel, 20 East Gordon Street (1878)

Southeastern residential/tything block
Scudder's Row, 1–9 East Gordon Street (1853)
11 East Gordon Street (1854)
Charles McGill House, 15 East Gordon Street
John Rowland House, 17–19 East Gordon Street (1881)
Frederick Groschaud House, 23 East Gordon Street (1854) – remodeled in 1909

Gallery

References

Monterey Square, Savannah
1847 establishments in Georgia (U.S. state)